Eva Struble (born 1981 in Kentucky) is an artist based in San Diego, California.

Struble received a BA in visual arts in 2003 from Brown University in Providence and an MFA in 2006 from Yale University School of Art in New Haven.

She has shown work in many exhibitions including Three Positions at Lombard-Freid Projects in New York, The Triumph of Painting at the Saatchi Gallery in London, Works on Paper at Green Hall at Yale University in New Haven and Group Show at List Art Centre at Brown University in Providence. She is represented by Lombard-Freid Projects in New York.

An Art in America review of her 2006 Lombard-Freid solo show, Superfund, called her paintings "eerily colorful". She currently resides in Fort Greene.

References

External links
Eva Struble on ArtFacts.Net

1981 births
Living people
People from Kentucky
American women painters
21st-century American women artists

Brown University alumni
Yale School of Art alumni